The Shire of Esperance is a local government area in the Goldfields-Esperance region of Western Australia, about  south of the town of Kalgoorlie and about  east-southeast of the state capital, Perth.

History

The Esperance Road District was established on 13 September 1895. Two weeks later, on 27 September 1895, the township of Esperance separated from the road district as the Municipality of Esperance. The municipality was re-absorbed into the road district on 30 October 1908. On 1 July 1961, it became the Shire of Esperance under the Local Government Act 1960, which reformed all remaining road districts into shires.

A railway line from Coolgardie to Esperance that was completed in 1927 led to development of farming in the mallee country to the north of Esperance.

On 11 July 1979, the American Skylab Space Station re-entered Earth's atmosphere headed for Western Australia and the Indian Ocean. It broke up during reentry and much of it landed in Esperance. In turn, the Shire issued a facetious A$400 fine to NASA for littering. It remained outstanding until April 2009, when radio show host Scott Barley of Highway Radio raised the funds from his morning show listeners, and paid the fine on behalf of NASA.

The main industry in the region is farming. The Department of Agriculture established a research station at Gibson finding the local soils to be deficient in trace elements and nitrogen. In 1953 there were 130 farms in the area, increasing to 347 in 1961 and over 650 in 1968.

Wards
The shire is divided into two wards. Prior to the 2005 elections, a 13-councillor setup with North, West and East wards each with two councillors was in place. The shire president is elected from amongst the councillors.

 Town Ward (six councillors)
 Rural Ward (three councillors)

Towns and localities
The towns and localities of the Shire of Esperance, divided into 32 localities, with population and size figures based on the most recent Australian census:

Heritage-listed places

As of 2023, 92 places are heritage-listed in the Shire of Esperance, of which twelve are on the State Register of Heritage Places.

References

External links
 

Esperance